Shen Shixi (born October 1952), also known as Shen Yiming, is a best-selling children's author in China. He is best known for his animal stories, and is known as the "King of Animal Stories". In 2015 he was the 9th highest earning author, earning royalties of 12 million RMB.

Life 
Shen Shixi was born in Shanghai in October 1952. In 1968 he was sent to a village of the Dai people in Xishuangbanna. In 1975 he joined the army, and was Head of the Propaganda Department. He became a member of the Yunnan Writers Association in 1982, and the China Writers Association in 1985. In 1992 he moved to creative office of the Chengdu Military Region.

Writing 
Shen is best known for his animal stories, and is known as the "King of Animal Stories".
Most of the animals in his books are wild animals, who live mainly in the vast wilderness, the hot humid tropical rainforest, the freezing snow-covered mountain, or the surging Lantsang River. The unique landscape and settings in Xishuang Banna has given Shen ample room for creation, as well as material for an original taste of life in the forest. The life of animals is extremely hard. Danger from their natural enemies, competition among the same kind, shortage of food, and hunting by humans have always stood as great threats to their lives. No matter how smart, sly, and strong the animals are, they would eventually be killed by other animals or by people. There are thus numerous traps in Shen’s jungles, and there is no happy ending or final closure. Even if an animal happened to escape from one crisis, it may never escape the next.

Awards and honours 
Winner of the National Outstanding Children’s Literature Award, and the Chen Bochui Children's Literature Award.

Books 
《猎狐》
《第七条猎狗》
《再被狐狸骗一次》
《狼王梦》 - Wolf King Dream
《白象家族》
《斑羚飞渡》
《最后一头战象》
《一只猎雕的遭遇》
《和乌鸦做邻居》
《野犬女皇》
《鸟奴》
《混血豺王》 
《红豺》 - Jackal and Wolf, translated by Helen Wang (Egmont, 2012)
 When Mu Meets Min, illustrated by Shen Yuanyuan

External links 
Shen Shixi on Worldcat
Shen Shixi on Paper Republic
Shen Shixi on Weibo (in Chinese)
Shen Shixi: Translation Workshop, by Dave Haysom, 31 March 2015

References 

1952 births
Chinese children's writers
Living people
Writers from Shanghai
20th-century Chinese writers
21st-century Chinese writers
Chen Bochui Children's Literature Award winners